is a Japanese football player.

Club statistics

References

External links

1982 births
Living people
Fukuoka University alumni
Association football people from Fukuoka Prefecture
Japanese footballers
J1 League players
J2 League players
Avispa Fukuoka players
Tokyo Verdy players
Giravanz Kitakyushu players
Satoshi Nagano
Satoshi Nagano
Japanese expatriate footballers
Japanese expatriate sportspeople in Thailand
Expatriate footballers in Thailand
Association football defenders